Tomislav Maretić (13 October 1854 – 15 January 1938) was a Croatian linguist and lexicographer.

He was born in Virovitica, where he attended primary school and the gymnasium in Varaždin, Požega and Zagreb. After graduating simultaneously Slavistics and Classical Philology at the Philosophical Faculty of the University of Zagreb in a three-year program, he passes his teacher exam for high-school teaching of Ancient Greek and Latin as primary, and Croatian as a secondary course. In 1877 he works as a probationary, and since 1880 as an assistant teacher in Velika gimnazija in Zagreb. He received his Ph.D. in 1884 in Slavic studies and philosophy with the thesis O nekim pojavama kvantitete i akcenta u jeziku hrvatskom ili srpskom ("On some changes of quantity and accent in Croatian or Serbian language"). He further specialized in postdoctoral studies at the neogrammarian centers of Leipzig and Prague.

He was appointed professor extraordinarius for "Slavic philology with particular emphasis on
Croatian and Serbian history of language and literature" in 1886 (since 1890 ordinary professor and JAZU member). In 1892 at the electional list of Magyar unionist party he was elected as a representative of Gospić, and since 1900 of Slunj kotar. In the period 1915 - 1918 he served as the president of JAZU, and twice as the head of the philological-historical class of the Academy, first from 1906 to 1913, then a second time from 1919 to 1928.

As a gymnasium student he published short literary works (signing as Tomislav). In the 1880s he focused on Croatian orthography and alphabet issues, having published a few papers on it (the study "Historija hrvatskoga pravopisa latinskijem slovima") in which he was laying foundations for the acceptance of phonologically-based orthography. At the end of the 19th century he published two grammars: the "academic" ("Gramatika i stilistika hrvatskoga ili srpskoga književnog jezika") and gymnasium ("Gramatika hrvatskoga jezika za niže razrede srednjih škola", both in 1899) version, in which he completely directed grammatical norm of the Croatian literary language towards Neoštokavian. Those two grammars represent the final confrontation with the competing conception of standard language advocated by Zagreb philological school. Beside Ivan Broz, he was among the first Shtokavian purists.

In 1907 he became editor of the massive dictionary compiled by the Academy, and until his death (from the lexeme maslo up to the lexeme pršutina) he has edited approximately 5 500 pages which makes him one of the most prolific Croatian lexicographers. He studied the language of Slavonian and Dalmatian writers and folk epics. He translated works from Polish, Latin and Ancient Greek, and some of the most well-known Croatian translations of the world's literature classics (Mickiewicz, Ovid, Virgil, Homer) are his work. In order to translate the classics he formed accentual hexameter which Petar Skok called "Maretić's life's work". By his beliefs Maretić is a Croatian Vukovian, the advocate of the Croatian and Serbian linguistic unity and the usage of phonological orthography, idealizer of the "pure people's language" and of exclusively (Neo-)Štokavian basis of the Serbo-Croatian standard language.

He died in Zagreb.

Works 

Lekcionarij Bernarda Spljećanina, JAZU, 208 pp., Zagreb, 1885
Nov prilog za istoriju akcentuacije hrvatske ili srpske, JAZU, 225 pp., Zagreb, 1885
O narodnim imenima i prezimenima u Hrvata i Srba, JAZU, 150 pp., Zagreb, 1886
Veznici u slovenskijem jezicima, JAZU, 299 pp., Zagreb, 1887
Slaveni u davnini, Matica hrvatska, 256 pp., Zagreb, 1889
Kosovski junaci i događaji u narodnoj epici, JAZU, 115 pp., Zagreb, 1889
Istorija hrvatskoga pravopisa latinskijem slovima, JAZU, 406 pp., Zagreb, 1889
Slavenski nominalni akcenat s obzirom na litavski, grčki i staroindijski, JAZU, 64 pp., Zagreb,1890
Život i književni rad Franje Miklošića, JAZU, 113 pp., Zagreb, 1892
Gramatika hrvatskoga jezika za niže razrede srednjih škola, Kugli, 270 pp., Zagreb, 1899
Gramatika i stilistika hrvatskoga ili srpskoga književnog jezika, Kugli, 700 pp., Zagreb, 1899
I. S. Turgenjev u hrvatskim i srpskim prijevodima, JAZU, 113 pp., Zagreb, 1904
Rječnik hrvatskoga ili srpskoga jezika: edited in multiple occasions more than 5 300 pages
Metrika narodnih naših pjesama, JAZU, 200 pp., Zagreb, 1907
Naša narodna epika, JAZU, 263 pp., Zagreb, 1909
Jezik slavonskijeh pisaca, JAZU, 88 pp., 1910
Jezik dalmatinskijeh pisaca XVIII. vijeka, JAZU, 92 pp., Zagreb, 1916
Hrvatski ili srpski «jezični savjetnik», Jugoslavenska njiva, 509 pp., Zagreb, 1923
Metrika muslimanske narodne epike, JAZU, 138 pp., Zagreb, 1936

References

1854 births
1938 deaths
Linguists from Croatia
People from Virovitica
Members of the Croatian Academy of Sciences and Arts
Faculty of Humanities and Social Sciences, University of Zagreb alumni
Burials at Mirogoj Cemetery
Slavists